Nogino is a rural locality (a selo) in Akulovsky Selsoviet, Pervomaysky District, Altai Krai, Russia. The population was 3 as of 2013.

Geography 
It is located on the Chumysh River.

References 

Rural localities in Pervomaysky District, Altai Krai